Glenn Edward Rogers, Jr. (born June 8, 1969) is a former football player in the Canadian Football League for seven years. He also played one season in the National Football League.

Football career
Rogers played defensive back for three different teams, mainly for the Edmonton Eskimos from 1993 to 1999. He was a CFL All-Star three times and was part of a Grey Cup winning team for the Eskimos. He also played for the Tampa Bay Buccaneers in 1991 for only one season.
The Grey cup is the Canadian equivalent to the NFL Super Bowl. Rogers is a teacher/coach for Memphis University School in Memphis, TN. He is also the Asst. to the Director of Admissions at MUS. Rogers is married to Tonette Rogers and has two children named Kendrick and Mya.

References

1969 births
Living people
American players of Canadian football
BC Lions players
American football defensive backs
Canadian football defensive backs
Edmonton Elks players
Memphis Tigers football players
Players of American football from Memphis, Tennessee
Players of Canadian football from Memphis, Tennessee
Saskatchewan Roughriders players
Tampa Bay Buccaneers players
Orlando Thunder players